Jam-e-Jam Television Festival is an annual festival for TV programs in Iran. It is annually organized by Islamic Republic of Iran Broadcasting to honor its top TV programs and films. The first festival was held in 2011.

References

Film festivals established in 2011
Recurring events established in 2011
2011 establishments in Iran
Islamic Republic of Iran Broadcasting